Julia McIlvaine is an American character actress, perhaps best known for voicing June on KaBlam!. She also has a career in singing, dance, and athletics.

Acting career
She has been in numerous theater plays, commercials and films.

Films
Office Killer as Linda
Fireworks
Handjive as Sophie
Enter Long Fang

Television
Judging Amy as Pamela Taylor
The Binikers as Sarah
The Summer of Ben Tyler as Nell Rayburn
The Lost Child as Caroline
Danny as Sally
KaBlam! as June, Dawn
A Christmas Memory as Rachel
MAD as Bambi, Calleigh Duquesne, Cruella de Vil, Cristina Yang
Normal, Ohio as Kimberly Miller
Madness Reins as Princess Olga
On The River as Jennifer
Pokémon: Twilight Wings as John and Oleana
The Summer of Ben Tyler as Nell Rayburn
Sword Art Online: Alicization as Azurica
Fate/stay night: Heaven's Feel as Sella (Original Theatrical Edition)
Monster Girl Doctor as Tisalia Scythia
My Next Life as a Villainess: All Routes Lead to Doom! X as Selena Burke

Video games

Music career
Homecoming
Kings Island Christmas

Awards

References

External links

American child actresses
American film actresses
American television actresses
Place of birth missing (living people)
American voice actresses
Living people
Year of birth missing (living people)
21st-century American women